Lee Glacier is a glacier flowing southeast into Jorda Glacier, in the Churchill Mountains, Antarctica. Mount Frost and Mount Coley are located at its head. The glacier was named in honor of Sandra Lee, a former New Zealand Minister of Conservation, for her contribution to environmental protection in Antarctica and its surrounding waters.

References

Glaciers of Oates Land